The men's 1500 metres event at the 1995 Summer Universiade was held on 1–3 September at the Hakatanomori Athletic Stadium in Fukuoka, Japan.

Medalists

Results

Heats
Qualification: First 4 of each heat (Q) and the next 4 fastest (q) qualified for the semifinals.

Semifinals
Qualification: First 5 of each semifinal (Q) and the next 2 fastest (q) qualified for the final.

Final

References

Athletics at the 1995 Summer Universiade
1995